Mahmadu Alphajor Bah (1 January 1977 – 21 September 2016) was a Sierra Leonean footballer who played mostly as an attacking midfielder.

Club career
His clubs included Halmstads BK in Sweden, KSC Lokeren in Belgium, Chunnam Dragons in South Korea, Xiamen Lanshi and Zhejiang Lücheng in China, Al-Qadisiya in Saudi Arabia, and Perlis FA in Malaysia.

Alphajor Bah died in a traffic collision in Freetown on 21 September 2016 when the vehicle he was driving was hit by a truck coming in an opposite road direction.

International career
Alphajor Bah was a regular member of Sierra Leone national team, known as the Leone Stars, between the years 2000 and 2008. He regularly played as an attacking midfielder or sometimes as a second striker for the Sierra Leone national team alongside striker Mohamed Kallon.

Personal life
Alphajor Bah was a very religious Muslim and he often publicly preached about Islam and the life of the Prophet Mohammad.

References

External links

Profile and stats - Lokeren

1977 births
2016 deaths
Sierra Leonean footballers
Sierra Leone international footballers
Sierra Leonean expatriate footballers
Association football forwards
Allsvenskan players
Challenger Pro League players
K.S.C. Lokeren Oost-Vlaanderen players
Jeonnam Dragons players
K League 1 players
Xiamen Blue Lions players
Zhejiang Professional F.C. players
Halmstads BK players
Al-Sailiya SC players
Perlis FA players
Sierra Leonean expatriate sportspeople in China
Expatriate footballers in Belgium
Expatriate footballers in Sweden
Expatriate footballers in South Korea
Expatriate footballers in China
Expatriate footballers in Malaysia
Sierra Leonean expatriate sportspeople in Sweden
Qatar Stars League players